The Göteborg City Race was a temporary motor racing circuit in Gothenburg, Sweden. The circuit was located in the city centre on part of docklands called Frihamnspiren, which was usually used as a concert venue. The spectator capacity for the venue was 30,000. The venue for the race weekends was known as "Eco Drive Arena", with all cars running on environmentally classed fuel.

History

It was inaugurated during June 2008, hosting one round of the Swedish Touring Car Championship (STCC), along with supporting races. The main event was won by Honda Racing driver Thed Björk. The success of the event with close to 40,000 spectators saw a return. On 11 February 2010, touringcartimes.com reported that Sport & Evenemang had secured four more years of racing on the street circuit.

In 2012, the STCC was replaced by the TTA – Racing Elite League. The merged STCC – Racing Elite League visited Göteborg in 2013 and 2014.

The circuit

The two hairpins at each end of the circuit which were very wide in and out and promising good overtaking possibilities because they were the reminiscents of those at the Hockenheimring.

Lap records 

The official race lap records at the Göteborg City Arena are listed as:

References

External links 

Motorsport venues in Sweden
Defunct motorsport venues
2008 establishments in Sweden
2014 disestablishments in Sweden
Buildings and structures in Gothenburg